Harve Tibbott (May 27, 1885 – December 31, 1969) was a Republican member of the U.S. House of Representatives from Pennsylvania.

Tibbott was born near Ebensburg, Pennsylvania. He graduated from the school of pharmacy of the University of Pittsburgh in 1906. He was engaged in the retail drug business and as a pharmacist in Ebensburg in 1906. He was treasurer of the William Penn Highway Association from 1913 to 1915, and treasurer of Cambria County, Pennsylvania, from 1932 to 1935. He was a member of the Republican State committee in 1936 and 1937, and president of the First National Bank of Ebensburg since 1938.

Tibbott was elected as a Republican to the Seventy-sixth and to the four succeeding Congresses. He was an unsuccessful candidate for reelection in 1948, defeated by Democrat Robert L. Coffey.

Sources 
 
 The Political Graveyard

External links 
 

1885 births
1969 deaths
People from Cambria County, Pennsylvania
American people of Welsh descent
American pharmacists
American bankers
Politicians from Pittsburgh
University of Pittsburgh alumni
Republican Party members of the United States House of Representatives from Pennsylvania
20th-century American politicians